"Return to Fantasy" is a song by British rock band Uriah Heep from their eighth studio album Return to Fantasy (1975). The song was written by David Byron and Ken Hensley and was the last single by the group to feature David Byron on lead vocals. The song was recorded in May 1975 in London in the Lansdowne and Morgan studios.

Covers
The song has been covered by German power metal band Gamma Ray on their studio album, Somewhere Out in Space, as the bonus track in Japan release.

Personnel
 David Byron – vocals
 Mick Box – guitars
 Ken Hensley – keyboard
 Lee Kerslake – drums
 John Wetton – bass guitar

References

1975 singles
Uriah Heep (band) songs
Songs written by David Byron
Songs written by Ken Hensley
1975 songs
Bronze Records singles